The Serie B 1952–53 was the twenty-first tournament of this competition played in Italy since its creation.

Teams
Cagliari had been promoted from Serie C, while Lucchese, Padova and Legnano had been relegated from Serie A.

Events
Relegations were reduced to two teams.

Final classification

Results

Promotion tie-breaker
Played in Florence on July 28

Legnano promoted to Serie A.

See also 
 Bruno Ruzza

References and sources
Almanacco Illustrato del Calcio - La Storia 1898-2004, Panini Edizioni, Modena, September 2005

Serie B seasons
2
Italy